Beverly Jo Torok-Storb is an American physician who is Professor of Clinical Research at the Fred Hutchinson Cancer Research Center. Her work considers the stem cells that generate blood and the microenvironment of bone marrow.

Early life and education 
Torok-Storb was born and raised in Erie, Pennsylvania. She has said that she grew up in a public housing project. She became interested in biology during high school, then was an undergraduate student at PennWest Edinboro. Torok-Storb worked toward her doctorate at the University of Pittsburgh.

Research and career 
Torok-Storb joined the Fred Hutchinson Cancer Research Center in 1978 and studied stem cells and the microenvironment of bone marrow. Her research identified the interactions between the stem cells in blood and the supportive cells in bone marrow, enabling critical transplants in leukemia and blood cancer. Prior to the work of Torok-Storb, it was assumed that bone marrow stromal cells could be derived from Hematopoietic stem cells. In 1987, Torok-Storb showed that this was not possible. She showed that cells within the bone marrow send signals to stem cells which determine whether transplantations are successful. The National Heart, Lung, and Blood Institute awarded Torok-Storb a $16.7 million grant to develop stem cell therapies.

Storb has also worked with an animal model that could predict the outcomes of hematopoietic stem cell transplants in humans.

Torok-Storb is part of the Cooperative Center of Excellence in Hematology.

Academic service 
Torok-Storb is an advocate for building a more inclusive academic culture. She has developed research opportunities for undergraduate students, high school students and people from historically excluded groups. She has said that her mentorship has come from her upbringing, “the only reason I made it as far as I did is because of special teachers along the way who let me know that I was capable and I could do it,”.

Publications

Awards 
 2013 Community Service Award
 2018 Seattle Association for Women in Science Award
 2018 Oliver Press Award for Extraordinary Mentorship
 2021 Hutch's first Humanity in Science Leadership Award

References 

Living people
People from Erie, Pennsylvania
University of Pittsburgh alumni
Fred Hutchinson Cancer Research Center people
American physicians
Year of birth missing (living people)